Manto is a monotypic genus of butterflies in the family Lycaenidae. Its sole species, Manto hypoleuca, is found in the Indomalayan realm.

Subspecies
M. h. hypoleuca Java
M. h. martina (Hewitson, 1869) Palawan
M. h. inopinata (Butler, 1883) Nias

References

Iolaini
Taxa named by Lionel de Nicéville
Butterflies described in 1865